Felicitas (minor planet designation: 109 Felicitas) is a dark and fairly large main-belt asteroid. It was discovered by German-American astronomer C. H. F. Peters on October 9, 1869, and named after Felicitas, the Roman goddess of success. The only observed stellar occultation by Felicitas is one from Japan (March 29, 2003).

This body is orbiting the Sun with a period of 4.43 years and an eccentricity (ovalness) of 0.3. Its orbital plane is inclined by 7.9° from the plane of the ecliptic. 109 Felicitas is classified as a carbonaceous GC-type asteroid. It is spinning with a rotation period of 13.2 hours. During 2002, 109 Felicitas was observed by radar from the Arecibo Observatory. The return signal matched an effective diameter of 89 ± 9 km. This is consistent with the asteroid dimensions computed through other means.

References

External links 
 
 

000109
Discoveries by Christian Peters
Named minor planets
000109
000109
18691009
Objects observed by stellar occultation